JS Hercules is an association football club established in Oulu, Finland, in 1998. The team started at the lowest level of the Finnish league system and was playing in the Third Division until promoted to Finnish Second Division, Kakkonen, for the first time for season 2016.

History
When Hercules played the first matches in 1998, some of the players had never played in a football club previously. Some had a little background in their local youth teams and nothing else. The team's core was a group of students mostly from the Faculty of Technology at the University of Oulu. This first generation is almost gone, but a couple are still playing for the reserve team, Herkku-Papat, or manage the team business in the background. Younger ranks are now taking care of the first team efforts on the field.

Current season
On season 2018 Hercules had three teams in different leagues. The first team plays in Kakkonen, group C. The reserve team, JS Hercules/2, plays in the Third Division in northern Finland; the third team, Herkku-Papat, in the Fifth Division in the Oulu area.

Current squad 2018

Outside the pitch
JS Hercules has combined football and business in creating a yearly seminar, FootCoop, which brings together teams and businesses from Northern Fennoscandia with exceptional speakers. The 2012 seminar featured Brian Deane, Tom Saintfiet, Martti Kuusela, Tom Markham, Jarmo Kekäläinen, Aki Riihilahti and Miguel Huhta, and others. At the same time they organized "Sister City Football Tournament" which included teams from Oulu's sister cities and other neighboring places like Alta IF, AC Oulu, RoPS and  Bodens BK.

References

Football clubs in Finland
Association football clubs established in 1998
1998 establishments in Finland
Sport in Oulu
JS Hercules